263 is the natural number between 262 and 264. It is also a prime number.

In mathematics
263 is
a balanced prime,
an irregular prime,
a Ramanujan prime, a Chen prime, and
a safe prime.

It is also a strictly non-palindromic number and a happy number.

References

Integers